Saint Romulus (or Remo) of Genoa was an early Bishop of Genoa, around the time of Saint Syrus. His dates are uncertain: since Jacobus de Voragine traditional lists compiled from local liturgies generally place his bishopric fourth in a largely legendary list. He fled from Genoa and never returned He died in the cave he inhabited at Villa Matutiae, a town on the Italian Riviera which later adopted his name, becoming San Remo (from 15th century until the first half of the 20th century), and later Sanremo.

Veneration
In 876 the bishop Sabbatinus brought his remains to Genoa, to the church of San Siro, where a new structure was consecrated in 1023.

Since he was invoked in defence of Villa Matutiæ from its inhabitants during enemy attack, the saint is depicted with episcopal dress and a sword in hand.

St Romulus' feast day had been kept on October 13, the traditional date of his death, as well as on December 22. In the Archdiocese of Genoa his feast day is now celebrated on November 6, together with two more of its early bishops: Saint Valentine of Genoa and Saint Felix of Genoa.

Notes

References

External links

 Saint of the Day, October 13: Romulus of Genoa at SaintPatrickDC.org
 (Antonio Borelli) Santi e Beati: San Romolo di Genova 

Christian saints in unknown century
Ante-Nicene Christian saints
Italian Roman Catholic saints
Bishops of Genoa
Year of birth unknown
Year of death unknown